Cyclone Lusi was the second severe tropical cyclone of the 2013–14 season and affected Fiji, Vanuatu and New Zealand.

The system that was to become Cyclone Lusi was first noted as a tropical disturbance on 7 March, while it was located to the east of Fiji. Over the next three days the system moved towards the north-northeast and gradually developed further, before it was named Lusi, late on 9 March, after it had developed into a tropical cyclone. The system dissipated on 17 March.

Meteorological history

The system was located within a marginally favourable environment for further development, which included low to moderate vertical wind shear and favourable sea surface temperatures. Over the next two days the system moved towards the north-northwest and slowly consolidated, as atmospheric convection wrapped into the system's low level circulation centre, before RSMC Nadi reported during 9 March that the system had developed into a tropical depression. During that day the system further consolidated as it affected Vanuatu and moved towards the north-northeast, before the United States Joint Typhoon Warning Center initiated warnings and designated the depression as Tropical Cyclone 18P later that day. RSMC Nadi subsequently named the system Lusi at around 23:00 UTC (11:00 FST), after it had developed into a category 1 tropical cyclone on the Australian tropical cyclone intensity scale.

Preparations and impact

Vanuatu
Late on 9 March, ahead of the depression being classified as a tropical cyclone and named Lusi, the Vanuatu Meteorology and Geo-Hazards Department issued tropical cyclone warnings for the Vanuatu provinces of Torba, Sanma, Penama and Malampa.

The cyclone killed 10 people and impacted as many as 20,000 people, especially in Torba, Sanma, Penama, Malampa and Shefa Provinces. Many low-lying areas were flooded and more than 40 structures were damaged or destroyed. All provinces of the country reported damage to agriculture.

Fiji
On 11 March, a tropical cyclone alert was issued for parts of the Western Division, as Lusi approached the islands from the west. During the next day gale warnings were issued for the Western Division before they were cancelled later that day, as the system turned towards the south sooner than had been expected. As a result, Fiji was spared any direct effects from the cyclone, while the associated trough of low pressure affected the islands until 13 March.

New Zealand
During 9 March, MetService started to warn that a tropical weather system might affect New Zealand by the end of that week.

Cyclone Lusi hit New Zealand shores on 13 March. In preparation for the event the New Zealand government advised people to fix loosened things (such as trampolines), and the Civil Defense team was put on alert. Winds reaching up to 130 km/h were expected to occur in the cities of Auckland, Whangarei and Hamilton, and the east coast of the North Island was put on high alert. Lusi brought severe winds as it moved southeast towards Wellington and the northern South Island in the evening of 15 March. On 16 March, the severe gale winds slightly weakened, and Lusi pushed away from New Zealand on 17 March.

Insured losses across the country amounted to NZ$4 million (US$3 million).

Retirement
Due to the impacts caused by the storm, the name Lusi was retired and was later replaced by 'Louise'.

See also
Cyclone Susan
Cyclone Evan

References

External links

Tropical cyclones in New Zealand
Tropical cyclones in Fiji
Tropical cyclones in Vanuatu
2014 in New Zealand
2013–14 South Pacific cyclone season
Category 3 South Pacific cyclones
Retired South Pacific cyclones
Lusi